De Laet is a Dutch-language occupational surname. A "laet" (modern spelling "laat") was a type of (released) serf. The archaic spelling De Laet is most common in Belgium, especially around Antwerp, while "de Laat" is more common in the Netherlands, especially in North Brabant. People with this name include: 

De Laet / DeLaet
Carlos de Laet (1847–1927), Brazilian journalist, professor and poet 
Jaspar Laet, 16th-century Flemish medical astrologer and almanac maker
Graham DeLaet (born 1982), Canadian golfer
Lost Frequencies, real name Felix De Laet (born 1993), Belgian DJ and record producer
Joannes de Laet (1581–1649), Dutch geographer and director of the Dutch West India Company
Ritchie De Laet (born 1988), Belgian footballer
De Laat
Itzhak de Laat (born 1994), Dutch short-track speed-skater

References

Dutch-language surnames
Occupational surnames